
Sasyk, or Kunduk ( – transcribed as previous), is a lagoon or liman in southern Ukraine, near the Danube Delta. It is a Ramsar listed wetland site important for migrating, breeding and moulting birds. About 25,000 pairs of wetland birds make their nests there and seasonal conglomerations of birds are up to 100,000 individuals.

The area of the lagoon is 215 km2, and the depth up to 3.3 m. Until 1978 the lagoon was separated into two parts: northern brackishwater area, including the rivers Cogâlnic and Sarata, and a southern marine area. The lagoon was separated from the sea by a 0.5 km wide sandbar.

Dam and reduced salinity 

In 1978 a concrete dam was built on the sandbar and the lagoon was connected to the Danube River by a canal, through which fresh flood waters come. This has adversely changed the salinity in the lake, and this plus disturbances from recreation and commercial fishing activities have influenced the habitat for wildfowl.

The aim of this Soviet dam project was to convert the lagoon to a fresh water lake to use for irrigation. The project ended in ecological, social and economic disaster.

A 2007 report stated that the lagoon had become too dangerous for swimming because of pollution, including pesticides and heavy metals. The water is described as greenish with an unpleasant smell. Many now favour breaking the dam and reconnecting the lagoon with the sea.

In 2022, Ukrainian-American filmmaker Andrea Odezynska's documentary film "Return Sasyk To The Sea" was released, detailing the history of the region and efforts to restore the damaged wetlands.

Notes and references 

Saline lakes of Europe
Lagoons of Ukraine
Estuaries of the Black Sea
Estuaries of Ukraine
Ramsar sites in Ukraine
Landforms of Odesa Oblast